The 17th Sarasaviya Awards festival, presented by the Associated Newspapers of Ceylon Limited, was held to honor the best films of 1989 Sinhala cinema on April 30, 1990, at the Elphinstone Theater, Maradana, Sri Lanka. President Ranasinghe Premadasa was the chief guest at the awards night.

The film Sagara Jalaya Madi Haduwa Oba Sanda won most number of awards with twelve awards including Best Film, Best Director and Best Actress.

Awards

References

Sarasaviya Awards
Sarasaviya